Delhi Kumar (born 19 December  1955) is a former Indian  actor known for playing various roles in teleserials like Chithi, Metti Oli, Anandham, Malargal, Enge Brahmanan & Bommalattam. He has also acted in a few Tamil films, such as Dumm Dumm Dumm (2001), Kannathil Muthamittal (2002) and Enthiran (2010).

Partial filmography

Actor
Films

Dubbing artist

Television

Awards 
Sun Kudumbam 2012 Life Achievements Awards for Metti Oli
Sun Kudumbam 2018 Best Maamanaar (Shared with Poovilangu Mohan) for Mahalakshmi
Sun Kudumbam 2019 Best Grandfather for Pandavar Illam

References 
 
 

Living people
Tamil male actors
Tamil male television actors
Tamil television presenters
Television personalities from Tamil Nadu
Male actors from Tamil Nadu
Male actors in Tamil cinema
1955 births